William Pennington (May 4, 1796 – February 16, 1862) was an American politician and lawyer. He was the 13th governor of New Jersey from 1837 to 1843. He served one term in the United States House of Representatives, during which he served as Speaker of the House from 1860 to 1861.

Early life and education
Born in Newark, New Jersey, he graduated from the College of New Jersey (now Princeton University) in 1813 and then studied law with Theodore Frelinghuysen. He was admitted to the bar in 1817 and served as a clerk of the United States District Court for the District of New Jersey (where his father was a judge) from 1817 to 1826. His father, William Sanford Pennington was a Revolutionary War veteran and was himself Governor of New Jersey from 1813 to 1815 before President Madison appointed him as a federal judge.

Governor of New Jersey
As a member of the Whig party, he was elected to the New Jersey General Assembly in 1828 and then was elected Governor of New Jersey annually from 1837 to 1843. His tenure as governor was marked by the "Broad Seal War" controversy. Following a disputed election for Congressional Representatives in New Jersey, Pennington certified the election of five Whig candidates while five Democrats were certified by the Democratic Secretary of State. After a lengthy dispute, the Democrats were eventually seated.

Speaker of the U.S. House of Representatives
In November 1858, Pennington was elected as a Republican to represent New Jersey's 5th congressional district in the U.S. House of Representatives during the 36th Congress but only after a protracted election for speaker of the House of Representatives lasting 44 ballots over eight weeks (December 5, 1859, to February 1, 1860). It was the second time since 1789 that the House elected a freshman congressman as its speaker (after Henry Clay in 1811); the feat has not been repeated since.

In March 1861, he penned his name on the Corwin Amendment, a proposed amendment to the U.S. Constitution shielding state "domestic institutions" (a euphemism for slavery) from future constitutional amendments and from abolition or interference by Congress. Submitted to the states for ratification shortly before the outbreak of the American Civil War, it was not ratified by the requisite number of states.

Death
After running unsuccessfully for reelection in 1860 to the 37th Congress, he returned to New Jersey, dying in Newark of an unintentional morphine overdose. He was interred at Mount Pleasant Cemetery in Newark.

See also
List of governors of New Jersey

Notes

References

Sources

New Jersey Historical Commission biography for William Pennington
New Jersey Governor William Pennington, National Governors Association
William Pennington biography from The Political Graveyard

1796 births
1862 deaths
Governors of New Jersey
Burials at Mount Pleasant Cemetery (Newark, New Jersey)
Republican Party members of the New Jersey General Assembly
New Jersey lawyers
Politicians from Newark, New Jersey
Princeton University alumni
Speakers of the United States House of Representatives
American Presbyterians
New Jersey Whigs
Republican Party members of the United States House of Representatives from New Jersey
Whig Party state governors of the United States
19th-century American politicians
Lawyers from Newark, New Jersey
Drug-related deaths in New Jersey
19th-century American lawyers